The Sweetwater Dam is a dam across the Sweetwater River in San Diego County, California. The -high masonry arch dam impounds  Sweetwater Reservoir.

The dam was first constructed in 1888 as part of a system of reservoirs on San Diego County rivers designed to provide water to irrigate crops along the coast and to supply the city of San Diego and its outlying towns. In 1916, a heavy flood caused both abutments of the dam to fail. The rest of the dam did not sustain heavy damage and it remains in use for flood control, water storage and recreation.

Design
Sweetwater Dam is a concrete thick Arch-gravity dam, straddling the Sweetwater River to form a reservoir capable of holding  of water. It is equipped with an intake tower on the upstream end connected to a high-pressure conduit that cuts through the base of the dam designed to release water from different depths of the reservoir; if water is released from a lower elevation the outflow will be greater. However, due to the low flow of the river, there is typically only a trickle of water below the dam as it impounds all the inflow from upstream.

The dam serves as a backup water storage facility for the San Diego metropolitan area today in the case of drought, and provides some local municipal water. The reservoir serves for wildlife management and recreation among other uses.

History

Planning

Despite having a mild climate and fertile soils, the San Diego area has a semiarid climate, and thus in its rivers most of the flow occur during the winter months, causing devastating floods. Conversely, in the summer, most of the smaller streams dry up and the larger waterways are reduced to trickles, leading to equally dangerous droughts. The bedrock of the region has notably low permeability, leaving little groundwater available (particularly when compared to nearby Los Angeles and Orange Counties).  The Sweetwater River, along with others such as the San Diego River and the San Luis Rey River, was one of the few streams that did flow with abundance year round. As the population of the region grew, however, the river could no longer provide what was needed in the dry season.

One of the area's early settlers, Frank Kimball, was the first to suggest the building of a dam on this particular reach of the Sweetwater River in 1869. Here the river after departing a broad valley cuts through a steep and narrow gorge, providing an ideal site for a reservoir. Groundbreaking of the dam was on November 17, 1886 and a quarry was excavated on the south side of the gorge early the following year to provide masonry rubble for the dam.

Construction
During the early stages of construction the Sweetwater River was diverted underneath the foundation structure into a square masonry culvert  in diameter. The tunnel provided sufficient discharge capacity for the river past the dam site, as 1886–1887 were below average precipitation years. However, in February 1887, the river swelled due to a minor storm and overflowed the foundations for two days. No significant damage was wrought.

As construction progressed, the original thin arch design was considered both unstable and inadequate for the county's growing water needs. A series of specialized stone steps were constructed on the faces of the dam to provide for future increases in height.

There were two types of stone, both metamorphic and one iron-rich, and both were considered excellent for the dam's construction. Sand was excavated from the river bottom for use in cement mixing; this was also declared exceptionally suitable. The dam held and no significant seepage was recorded.

Horses and mules were used to transport stone from the quarry to the dam site using carts. To the south of the structure was constructed the spillway or "waste weir", consisting of eight overflow channels separated by masonry piers.

The total cost came to $234,074.11, including preliminary investigations and purchase of the land to be flooded by the reservoir. The dedication ceremony was on April 19, and over three thousand people came to watch. At that time, the dam was the highest masonry arch dam in the United States and was considered an engineering marvel and tourist attraction.

1911 expansion
In the winter of 1895, heavy rains caused the Sweetwater River to rise to record levels, and the dam's outlets and spillways were unable to handle the excess inflow of water. For more than 40 hours during the peak of the storm, the reservoir overtopped the dam by nearly two feet, spilling over in a massive waterfall. The floods caused severe damage to the abutments of the dam and eroded the riverbed below, but the dam survived. To do this, a -tall vertical masonry parapet was added to the top of the dam, the spillways were reconstructed, and the intake tower was raised.

1916 failure

In the winter of 1915, southern California was experiencing a devastating drought that had drained area reservoirs to record low levels over more than three consecutive years, causing massive agricultural and ranching losses. Residents of San Diego County were so desperate that the city of San Diego hired a man called Charles Hatfield, known as "the Rainmaker". The city promised Hatfield $10,000 if he could make it rain significantly by the end of the year. Hatfield's venture was apparently a success, but it is not known what actually caused the massive floods that tore through the county beginning December 9, the day after he started his ill-fated scheme.

More than thirty-nine inches (991 mm) of rain fell during the following month, and storms continued deluging the county well into early 1916. The area's rivers and streams rose to their highest recorded levels in years. More than 200 bridges were washed out, entire communities were swept away, levees collapsed, and valleys were inundated. All the bridges along the San Diego, Sweetwater and Otay rivers were washed out except for a rail bridge that was left standing alone with its ends missing. The earthen Otay Dam, several miles southeast of the Sweetwater on the Otay River, burst on January 27 sending a wall of water into southern Chula Vista. Flooding deposited so much sediment that the southern end of San Diego Bay was filled with it – much of the sand remains today in the form of shoals that must be periodically dredged to accommodate boat traffic.

The reservoir overtopped the dam crest by an estimated  in an event similar to, but far larger than 1895. The river breached the north abutment of the dam, then soon after the south end just left of the spillway went with it. Like in 1895, the main structure of the dam was not heavily damaged but the river eroded enough material around the structure to allow two-thirds of the reservoir to drain. The dam was subsequently rebuilt and an additional spillway added to pass future floods.

Later events

In 1939 and 1940, the dam received a major overhaul in which the 1911 parapet was lowered by two feet and built into an emergency spillway as the two existing spillways were considered insufficient to handle large floods. The dam then came under the ownership of the Sweetwater Authority, which still runs the dam today. In the late 20th century, a new concrete coating was applied to the dam in an attempt to stop leakage. However, the dam's spillways were still considered inadequate to handle more than 20 percent of a "probable maximum flood". On April 7, 2006, the Sweetwater Dam was recognized as a Historic Civil Engineering Landmark by the American Society of Civil Engineers.

See also
List of dams and reservoirs in California

Works cited

References

External links

Dams in California
Masonry dams
Buildings and structures in San Diego County, California
Cuyamaca Mountains
Dams completed in 1888
Dam failures in the United States
United States local public utility dams
Historic Civil Engineering Landmarks
1888 establishments in California